The 1952–53 Soviet Cup was the third edition of the Soviet Cup ice hockey tournament. 25 teams participated in the tournament, which was won by Dynamo Moscow.

Regular season

1/16 Finals

1/8 Finals

Quarterfinals

Semifinals

Final
 
(* Automatic victory because opponent did not participate.)

External links
 Season on hockeyarchives.info
 Season on hockeyarchives.ru

Cup
Soviet Cup (ice hockey) seasons